Nesrine Kheloudja Merouane (born January 23, 1995 in Algiers) is an Algerian volleyball player.

Club information
Current club :  GSP (ex MC Algiers)

References
 
 

1995 births
Volleyball players from Algiers
Living people
Algerian women's volleyball players
Wing spikers
21st-century Algerian women